Hristo Gandev (Христо Гандев; December 25, 1907, Veliko Tarnovo - July 27, 1987, Sofia) was a Bulgarian professor and historian.

References

20th-century Bulgarian historians
1907 births
1987 deaths
Academic staff of Sofia University
People from Veliko Tarnovo
Bulgarian National Awakening